Hirokin: The Last Samurai (released as "Fallen Empire" in European markets) is an independent American action-adventure film released in 2012. The film is directed by writer/director Alejo Mo-Sun and produced by Mo-Sun Welteroth Media. It stars Wes Bentley, Jessica Szohr, Angus Macfadyen, and Julian Sands.

Synopsis 
The film tells the story of Hirokin, a samurai on a post-apocalyptic planet. After his family is murdered by the evil dictator Griffin, the reluctant warrior, left for dead in the desert, vows to avenge his loved ones and to defend his people.

Cast 
 Wes Bentley as Hirokin
 Jessica Szohr as Orange
 Angus Macfadyen as Moss
 Laura Ramsey as Maren
 Julian Sands as Griffin
 Mercedes Manning as Terra

Reception 

Paul Chambers of MovieChambers.com gave the film an F grade and wrote: "This direct-to-video nightmare will have you hitting the eject button faster than light speed".

References

External links 
 
 Alejo Mo-Sun official website
 Former Hirokin official website

2012 action films
American fantasy adventure films
American independent films
American science fiction action films
American action adventure films
Films scored by John Paesano
2012 films
2012 independent films
2010s English-language films
2010s American films